The 2003 South American Championships in Athletics were held from June 20 to June 22 at the Polideportivo Máximo Viloria in Barquisimeto, Venezuela.  Detailed day-by-day reports can be found on the IAAF website.

Medal summary

Men's events

Women's events

Medal table

Participation

 (33)
 (3)
 (75)
 (40)
 (36)
 (20)
 (4)
 (4)
 (2)
 (8)
 (62)
 (9)

See also
 Men Results – GBR Athletics
 Women Results – GBR Athletics
 Full results
 CAC Results

References

S
South American Championships in Athletics
Athletics
A
Sport in Barquisimeto
2003 in South American sport